Sugash (Sugaş) is a rural locality (a selo) in Ust-Koksinsky District, the Altai Republic, Russia. The population was 521 as of 2016. There are 10 streets.

Geography 
Sugash is located 68 km northwest of Ust-Koksa (the district's administrative centre) by road. Talda is the nearest rural locality.

References 

Rural localities in Ust-Koksinsky District